Ufuoma Stacey McDermott (born 23 April 1981) is a Nigerian film-maker, actress and former model.

Early life
Ejenobor was born in Benin City to Nigerian parents of Urhobo descent who hails from Delta State in Nigeria. She moved a lot - from Benin City to Jos, where she spent the better part of her toddler years, and later to Lagos, where she has lived for the greater part of her life and still resides till date. At the age of seven, her father coined a pet name for her: ISIO (which means "star" in Urhobo). She was so named after the star actress of the TELEFEST programme put together by NTA Benin, The Pot of Life.

Personal life
Ejenobor got married on 23 April 2010 to Steven McDermott.
She officially changed her name to Ufuoma McDermott on 23 May 2014 at a Lagos high court.

Education
She went through Alama Private School Jos, Plateau state, Tunwase Nursery and primary school Ikeja, Lagos and finally Molly International Nursery and primary Ajao Estate for her nursery and primary education. She then attended Federal Government College, Odogbolu, Ogun State for her secondary education.

Ufuoma later bagged a degree in French language from the University of Lagos where she partook in a Federal Government scholarship holiday programme. She also has certificates and diplomas from Alliance Française and NIIT. She holds a master's degree in Public and International Affairs, also from the University of Lagos.

In 2011, she attended New York Film Academy in Los Angeles for an acting course and later on a film making course from Dov Simen's Hollywood Film Institute. In 2013, she obtained a certificate in Human resource management from the London Business School.

In Summer 2015, she was part of the Relativity Education program from Nigeria, owned by Relativity Media in Beverly Hills.

Entertainment
She started a career in entertainment with modelling in 2000 as a photographic model and later moved on to the runway and beauty pageants.

Pageants
By 2002, she had participated in two mini-pageants, won the Miss Ebony beauty pageant and partaken in her first national pageant: Miss Commonwealth(Vanessa Ekeke), where she won the Miss Congeniality prize. Later the same year, she emerged 1st runner up in the queen Afrik beauty pageant (Tamilore Kuboye).

2003 saw her in the Queen of all Nations beauty pageant (Dubra Fufeyin) where she was again the 1st runner up.

In 2004 she contested in the Miss Nigeria beauty pageant where she emerged ...yet, 1st runner up. Not long after she was crowned Miss Earth Nigeria and consequently went to represent the country at the Miss Earth 2004

Film
In February 2004, Ejenobor decided on a movie career. Starting off with Zeb Ejiro's The President Must Not Die, she has continued to have roles in movies. In May 2005, she played her first lead role in Life and Death, her third movie after The President Must Not Die and Guy on the Line. By December 2005, she played Chibuzor on the Edge of Paradise TV series produced by Royal Roots network.

In 2008 she took on the role of "Lillian Wright" in the TV series My Mum and I a role that garnered her a nomination for a best actress award at the 2010 Festival de Télévision de Monte-Carlo and one at The Terracotta Nigerian TV and Film Awards. She was nominated as the Actor of the year 2011 at the Future Awards

Stage

In January 2018, McDermott reprised her roles as "Mama Baby", "Women Call Leader" and "Sister Esther" in the stage production Hear Word!, which returned for the second year in a row to Harvard and was staged at the prestigious American Repertory theatre in Cambridge, Massachusetts, U.SA. The production covers various themes, which address issues against women in the society. The play, which made its debut in Lagos, Nigeria in 2014, also features the acting talents of Joke Silva, Taiwo Ajayi-Lycett, Elvina Ibru and Bimbo Akintola.

Hear Word! featured at the Edinburgh International Festival in August 2019, and McDermott, Joke Silva, Taiwo Ajayi-Lycett and other cast members performed at the Royal Lyceum, in Edinburgh, Scotland. The Guardian UK, in its review of the show described it as "at once tough and inspirational", giving the play a three-star out of five.

The USM Show with Ufuoma McDermott

In July 2019, McDermott put together a live-theater experience at the Eko Hotel and Towers in Lagos, tagged "The USM Show with Ufuoma McDermott". The event was a potpourri of live music, dance performances and a debut of her stage production "The Magic of a Dream".

The Magic of a Dream was directed by Toritseju Ejoh and featured acting performances from several notable Nigerian thespians including Femi Branch, Chioma Akpotha, Offiong Anthony (Thin Tall Tony), Akah Nnani and Zara Udofia-Ejoh. The USM Show also featured live musical and comedy performances from a range of Nigerian entertainers, including, Teni the entertainer, Seyi Law and MC Abbey.

Movie Directing/Production
At the premiere of her movie directorial debut, McDermott revealed that she had begun writing the story for the film Christmas is Coming in 2013. The movie was however released in November 2017 ahead of the Christmas holidays.

In 2018, she earned her sophomore production credit with the release of What Just Happened in cinemas across Nigeria.

Recognition
 Best Actress in a TV series Nominee - Nigeria Entertainment Awards 2011
 Actor of the Year 2011 Nominee- The Future Awards
 Best Actress nominee - Golden Nymph Awards 2010 (Monte Carlo Television Festival)
 Best Actress in a Drama series nominee, Terracotta TV and Film Awards
 Go Red Africa, Best Female Model, 2007
 African Youth Society, Role Model Award, 2009
 Represented Nigeria at the Miss Earth 2004 beauty pageant
 McDermott was a speaker at TEDx Rayfield, which held in December 2017

 Pageant

Ufuoma also received a Golden Nymph Best Actress nomination at the 2010 Monte Carlo Television Festival alongside Tina Fey, Jane Krakowski and January Jones.

Awards

Filmography

References

External links
 

1981 births
Living people
Miss Earth 2004 contestants
Nigerian female models
University of Lagos alumni
21st-century Nigerian actresses
People from Benin City
Federal Government College, Odogbolu alumni
Miss Nigeria delegates
Urhobo people
Nigerian beauty pageant contestants
Actresses from Delta State
Nigerian filmmakers